In Dutch history, the year 1672 is referred to as the  (Disaster Year). In May 1672, following the outbreak of the Franco-Dutch War and its peripheral conflict the Third Anglo-Dutch War, France, supported by Münster and Cologne, invaded and nearly overran the Dutch Republic. At the same time, it faced the threat of an English naval blockade in support of the French endeavor, though that attempt was abandoned following the Battle of Solebay. The cities of the coastal provinces of Holland, Zealand and Frisia underwent a political transition: the city governments were taken over by Orangists, opposed to the republican regime of the Grand Pensionary Johan de Witt, ending the First Stadtholderless Period.

By late July however, the Dutch position had stabilised, with support from Holy Roman Emperor Leopold I, Brandenburg-Prussia and Spain; this was formalised in the August 1673 Treaty of the Hague, which Denmark joined in January 1674. Following further defeats at sea at the hands of the Dutch navy, the English, whose parliament was suspicious of King Charles's motives in his alliance with France, and with Charles himself wary of French domination of the Spanish Netherlands, settled a peace with the Dutch republic in the Treaty of Westminster in 1674. With England, Cologne and Münster having made peace with the Dutch and with the war expanding into the Rhineland and Spain, French troops withdrew from the Dutch Republic, retaining only Grave and Maastricht. To offset these setbacks, Swedish forces in Swedish Pomerania attacked Brandenburg-Prussia in December 1674 after Louis threatened to withhold their subsidies; this sparked Swedish involvement in the 1675–1679 Scanian War and the Swedish-Brandenburg War whereby the Swedish army tied up the armies of Brandenburg and some minor German principalities plus the Danish army in the north.

From 1674 to 1678, the French armies managed to advance steadily in the southern Spanish Netherlands and along the Rhine, defeating the badly coordinated forces of the Grand Alliance with regularity. Eventually the heavy financial burdens of the war, along with the imminent prospect of England's reentry into the conflict on the side of the Dutch and their allies, convinced Louis XIV of France to make peace despite his advantageous military position. The resulting Peace of Nijmegen between France and the Grand Alliance left the Dutch Republic intact and France generously aggrandized in the Spanish Netherlands.

Situation in the Republic

During the Eighty Years' War there had been tension in the provinces between adherents of a government ruled by the burgher oligarchy, called regents, and those who favoured a government led by the Prince of Orange. These tensions had escalated in 1650 when William II, Prince of Orange had tried to conquer Amsterdam, the main bastion of the Regents of the De Graeff and Bicker clans. After negotiations, he succeeded in removing a number of his adversaries from office.

When William died from smallpox later that year, the republican party came back into power. The Act of Seclusion declared that they would not appoint his son, William III of Orange, or anybody else to the office of Stadholder, stating that a supreme head of government would be harmful to 'True Liberty'. Johan de Witt was appointed Grand Pensionary of Holland and led the States of Holland, the most important province within the Union.

The takeover by the regents did not go without protest from the Orangists, but with the economy booming and peace on the Union's borders they had little opportunity to remove the government from office. To appease the Orangists, and because of their own business interests, the Dutch Regents tried to keep the peace within Europe.

Foreign affairs
When the Republic fought for its independence from Spain, it had allied with France and England. In 1648, as part of the Peace of Westphalia, the Republic made peace with Austria and Spain. France had only made peace with Austria and continued fighting Spain until the Treaty of the Pyrenees in 1659. A condition of that peace was that Louis XIV would marry Maria Theresa, daughter of Philip IV of Spain. Maria Theresa would also renounce her share of the inheritance in exchange for a large dowry. The dowry, however, was never paid by the Spanish.

During the 1650s and 1660s the existing tensions between Dutch trade interests and English trade interests grew. The First Anglo-Dutch War was fought between the republics, resulting in a victory for the English. In a secret appendix to the Treaty of Westminster, the Act of Seclusion, Holland declared that it abolished the office of Stadholder and would never allow the States-General of the Netherlands to appoint a member of the House of Orange to the office of Captain-General. Oliver Cromwell, who was Lord Protector of England at that time, insisted on this condition because William II had assisted Charles I (his father-in-law) during the English Civil War. While supporters of the Dutch Regent favoured diminishing the influence of the House of Orange, by agreeing to the English conditions they intermingled internal and foreign affairs and infuriated the pro-Orange faction.
 
When Charles II was crowned king of England in 1660 during the English Restoration, the Act of Seclusion was declared void, but to the dismay of Holland, Charles affirmed those clauses of the peace which negatively impacted Dutch trade interests.

An English attempt to take over Dutch trade and colonies led to the Second Anglo-Dutch War. After the previous war Johan de Witt had supervised the expansion and improvement of the Dutch navy at the cost of neglecting the Dutch army. With the new fleet and the help of France, with whom they had allied again, the Dutch ultimately defeated the English at sea through the Raid on the Medway and put pressure on the English ally Münster. First Münster and then England were forced to make peace. While France had helped to put pressure on England and Münster they had not committed a major part of their army or fleet. After the death of Philip IV, Louis XIV claimed part of the inheritance for his wife. According to local law in parts of the Spanish Netherlands daughters of an earlier marriage took precedence before the sons of a later marriage. The way Louis XIV explained this, Maria Theresa, daughter of the first marriage of Philip IV, should inherit the Spanish Netherlands because Philip's son, Charles II was from Philip's second marriage. This went against the interests of the Dutch Republic, who preferred having a weak state as their neighbour to the south.

Because of this, Johan de Witt allied with the defeated English and Sweden, who had an army nearby in Germany, forming the Triple Alliance. In secret clauses of the treaty they agreed to use force if Louis XIV would not come to terms with Spain.

Renversement des Alliances
France made peace with Spain, but because the secret clauses of the Triple Alliance were soon made public, Louis XIV felt insulted by the "perfidious" Dutch, who according to him had broken faith. Immediately after the peace agreement, France took steps to isolate the Republic. Sweden and Münster were quickly bribed, but the English public distrusted Louis XIV. The English king, on the other hand, saw war with the Dutch as being in his best interests. He hoped that a defeat of the Republic would lead to the fall of the republican government so that his nephew, William III of Orange, could take power. A war would also be a good opportunity to crush the Dutch competition in trade and colonies. Additionally, Louis promised Charles a notable sum of money, so enabling him to rule without having to consult the English parliament.

In 1670, after the mediation of Charles' sister Henrietta Anne Stuart, wife of Louis's brother the Duc d'Orléans, France and England signed the secret Treaty of Dover.

To war

The Dutch were aware that negotiations between England and France were going on, but specific details were not known. Johan de Witt counted on the unpopularity among the English public of a war with a fellow Protestant nation and tried to improve relations with the French. The discussion on the issue of the Spanish Netherlands, however, yielded no consensus between the two countries. France saw the Rhine as its natural border and between France and the Rhine lay the Spanish Netherlands and the Dutch Generality Lands. The Dutch felt threatened by the French ambitions. According to the French ambassador, the Dutch acted from the motto: Gallicus amicus, non vicinus, or "The Frenchman is a good friend, but a bad neighbour". The Dutch again reinforced their fleet, but made insufficient preparations for their army because of a shortage of money. The Regents also distrusted an army that had often been an instrument of the Orange party. With war becoming more and more likely, pressure increased on the Dutch government to appoint William III, who had not yet come of age, to the office of Stadtholder and Captain-General. In February 1672, Johan de Witt finally agreed to appoint William as Captain-General for the duration of a single war campaign.

War
On 12 March 1672 Robert Holmes attacked a Dutch trade convoy, the Smyrna fleet. France, the Electorate of Cologne and the Bishopric of Münster declared war in April. In June, Louis XIV's army, led by Louis II de Bourbon, Prince de Condé and Turenne bypassed the Dutch southern defence through the Spanish Netherlands, the possessions of Münster and Cologne and other French allies and invaded the Dutch from the east.

At the IJssel, a short battle was easily won by the French and Groenlo was taken. The whole of the Republic lay open to the French. Panic broke out in the cities in Holland, Zeeland and Utrecht. Lower and middle-class people revolted against the government and demanded the appointment of the Prince along with the punishment of those responsible for the war and the state of the army. Johan de Witt and several others resigned and the government of the Regents fell. Partisans of William III took over. One of William's first acts was to strike out the word 'honourably' from Johan de Witt's letter of resignation.

Lynching of the De Witt brothers

Popular sentiment remained unsatisfied and frustrations with the hopeless military situation led to the search for scapegoats. In August, Cornelis de Witt, the less gifted and less popular brother of Johan de Witt, was imprisoned in The Hague on suspicion of treason and plotting to assassinate William. When Johan de Witt visited his brother, the small cavalry security detail present was sent away on the pretext of stopping a group of marauding peasants. Around the prison a crowd had gathered, demanding the punishment of the brothers. The prison was stormed — according to some contemporary accounts, after Orangist Cornelis Tromp, an enemy of Johan de Witt, had given the sign — by civil militia. The brothers were taken and murdered by the militia members and their bodies mutilated and partly eaten by the crowd. The names of a few of the murderers became known but they were protected and, in some cases, even rewarded by Prince William. Many modern historians suspect that the murders were the result of a conspiracy involving, among others, William himself, although direct evidence for his involvement has not been found.

The Waterline

The French had advanced from the IJssel to Utrecht. By that time, negotiations had begun. Louis XIV and Charles II of England had intended that William become Sovereign Prince at the head of a Hollandic rump state principality, a joint protectorate (with the British occupying key Hollandic cities and the isle of Walcheren). Louis halted his army to allow the Orangists to take over Holland and come to an arrangement with him. He offered the Dutch peace in exchange for either the southern fortresses, religious freedom for Catholics and six million guilders, or the retention of his present conquests and sixteen million guilders. These demands, especially the financial portions, led to a renewed public outrage and the Dutch mood abruptly changed from defeatism to a dogged determination to resist the French.

While negotiations took place, the French failed to prevent the Dutch from inundating the Dutch Waterline. Before the French understood the nature and importance of this defence system, William III's small army withdrew behind it and further French advance was blocked by an impassable barrier of water and mud. This small success for the Dutch was followed by others. The Dutch fleet under admiral Michiel de Ruyter had already defeated the Anglo-French fleet at the Battle of Solebay, and on 28 August 1672 the German Bishop of Münster, Bernhard von Galen, withdrew from the siege of Groningen – an event still celebrated annually in Groningen.

On the diplomatic front, the Holy Roman Empire and Spain took the side of the Netherlands. In 1673, Bonn fell to a Dutch army. This forced the French to retreat from most of the Republic. England, Münster and Cologne made peace in 1674; the French fought on until 1678. (For the rest of the war, see Franco-Dutch War.)

Effects
The experience of the Rampjaar had considerable influence on the direction of Dutch foreign policy. William III saw it as his life's work to defend both the Republic and Europe against French hegemony. In all the wars of Louis XIV, the Dutch would support his adversaries. In 1688, when faced with an English king who again seemed to side with the French, the Dutch mobilised their full resources in order to invade Britain and overthrow the Catholic Stuart Dynasty (the Glorious Revolution)—an event of immense historical importance. Although a gamble, it was considered worthwhile, since after the Rampjaar, the possibility of a Catholic and French-dominated Britain was regarded as a mortal threat to the Netherlands. In England, public opinion was already turning against the French but was accelerated by the war of 1672. While Charles II and his successor James II of England still had French sympathies, they had to take into account the English public's distrust of France.

The Dutch economy never fully recovered from the severe crisis, although the Dutch Golden Age is sometimes said to have continued until the end of the century.  The art market was as severely affected as other trades. A famous comment by Jan Vermeer's widow described how he was unable to sell work thereafter. The leading maritime artists, Willem van de Velde the Elder and his son Willem II, both emigrated to London, never to return.

See also
 Annus horribilis
 Castle Amerongen, castle burnt by the French in 1673
 List of Dutch structures damaged by the French (1672–1673)

References

Citations

Sources 
Bowen, Marjorie (1993). The William and Mary Trilogy, Vol. 1: I Will Maintain. Alberta: Inheritance Publications. pp. 353–359, 382.
Kenneth Harold Dobson Haley (1986). An English diplomat in the Low Countries: Sir William Temple and John de Witt, 1665–1672. Oxford: Clarendon Press.
Herbert H. Rowen (1986). John de Witt, Statesman of the "True Freedom". Cambridge University Press.
Israel, J. I. (1998). The Dutch Republic: Its Rise, Greatness, and Fall 1477–1806 (1st paperback ed.) [1st ed. 1995]. Oxford: Clarendon Press. .

Wars involving England
Wars involving France
Wars involving the Dutch Republic
1672 in Europe
Dutch words and phrases
1672 in the Dutch Republic
17th century in the Dutch Republic